Tom Gilb (full name "Thomas Steven Gilb", born 1940) is an American systems engineer, consultant, and author, known for the development of software metrics, software inspection, and evolutionary processes.

Biography 
Tom Gilb was born in 1940 in Pasadena, California, United States. He emigrated to the United Kingdom in 1956 and to Norway in 1958. He took his first job with IBM in 1958 and became a freelance consultant in 1960.

He is known for his early work on evolutionary software development processes from 1968 to 1981, which was a forerunner of agile software development methods.

He is currently a consultant, teacher and author, in partnership with his son Kai Gilb. He mainly helps multinational clients improve their organizations and methods by using "evolutionary systems delivery" (Evo). His method is based upon the core ideas that all architecture focus has to be on delivering value to the stakeholders and that engineering principles and scientific methods must be used in planning and management of change projects using a formal engineering language like the one that he has developed and named "Planguage". He has "guest lectured at universities all over UK, Europe, China, India, USA, Korea – and has been a keynote speaker at dozens of technical conferences internationally".

He is a member of INCOSE and is active in the Norwegian chapter, NORSEC, which presented him with an award in 2003. He lectures at INCOSE local chapters on his worldwide travels and at INCOSE conferences.

In 2012 he was made an Honorary Fellow of the British Computer Society.

Publications 
Gilb has written nine books and several articles. A selection includes:

 Software Inspection, 1993. . (with coauthor Dorothy Graham)
 Principles of Software Engineering Management, 1988.  (19th printing).
 Software Metrics (Winthrop computer systems series), 1977.
 Competitive Engineering: A Handbook for Systems & Software Engineering Management using Planguage, 2005. . (Planguage is a formal, natural language modelling notation invented by Gilb that adds rigour to the requirement documentation.)

References

External links
 Gilb's website
 Tom Gilb speaking at TedX in Trondheim 2013 about his engineering approach to defining all qualities in systems

1940 births
Living people
Writers from Pasadena, California
American expatriates in Norway
IBM employees
Systems engineers
American software engineers
Computer science writers
American consultants
Fellows of the British Computer Society
Engineers from California